Filer is a surname. Notable people with the surname include:

Lee Filer (born 1980), American politician
Mike Filer (born 1990), Canadian football player
Nathan Filer, British writer
Randall K. Filer (born 1952), American economist
Rodney Filer (born 1974), American arena football player
Tom Filer (born 1956), American baseball player